ILIT may refer to:

 Life insurance trust
 Intralymphatic immunotherapy

Ilit may refer to:

 Ilit language